Bald Mountain is a mountain in Sullivan County, New York. It is located south of Debruce. Rattle Hill is located northwest and Gray Hill is located west-northwest of Bald Mountain.

References

Mountains of Sullivan County, New York
Mountains of New York (state)